Ameet Pall (born April 28, 1987) is a Canadian football defensive end who is currently a free agent. He was selected fifth overall by the Calgary Stampeders in the 2012 CFL Draft and was signed by the team on May 15, 2012. Following his release, he signed with the Alouettes on June 25, 2012. He was ranked as the seventh best player in the Canadian Football League's Amateur Scouting Bureau final rankings for players eligible in the 2012 CFL Draft. He played college football for the Wofford Terriers. He was signed by the Winnipeg Blue Bombers on September 10, 2014.

References

External links
Montreal Alouettes bio
Winnipeg Blue Bombers bio

1987 births
Living people
Players of Canadian football from Quebec
Canadian football defensive linemen
Calgary Stampeders players
Montreal Alouettes players
Winnipeg Blue Bombers players
Wofford Terriers football players
Canadian football people from Montreal